Jana S. Rošker (born 21 May 1960) is a Slovenian sinologist and professor at the Department of Asian Studies at the Faculty of Arts of the University of Ljubljana.

Biography 
Jana Rošker was born in 1960 in Murska Sobota. She was a student of sinology, journalism and pedagogy at the University of Vienna. She also studied at Beijing Foreign Studies University, Nankai University and Beijing University. She received her PhD at the University of Vienna in 1988 for the thesis 'Theories of the State and Anarchist Criticism of the State in China at the Turn of the Century'. During her studies and later in life she spent over ten years in People's Republic of China and Taiwan.

Academic career 
In her research she mostly examines subjects related to Chinese philosophy, Chinese logic, Chinese epistemology, the methodology of intercultural research and the theory of knowledge. In these research fields, she has hitherto published over 30 books (authored academic monographs), served edited volumes, over 200 articles and chapters in monographs. Since 1995, she has been a professor at the Chair of Sinology, Department of Asian Studies at the Faculty of Arts of the University of Ljubljana. She was one of the founders of this department and chaired it for several years. She was one of the hosts of the 'XVI. Biennial Conference of the European Association of Chinese Studies', which was held in Ljubljana in 2006 and the chief organizer of many other international conferences in Chinese studies (2005, 2010, 2011, 2013, 2015, 2017, 2019, 2022).
She is founder, first president and honorary member of the European Association for Chinese Philosophy and chief editor of the academic journal Asian Studies. Currently, she is the vice-president of the International Society for Chinese Philosophy (ISCP).

Prizes and Awards
2010 Great prize of the Faculty of Arts, University of Ljubljana;
2013 ARRS (Slovene national research agency) award for the extraordinarily research achievement in humanities;
2015 Zois Award - Slovene national award for research achievements;
2015 Golden Plaque of the University of Ljubljana for contributions in research and high education.
2020 French-Taiwanese Cultural Foundation Award (Prix de la Fondation culturelle franco-taïwanaise).

Works

Publications

All publications published in the last 10 years (2012-2022): https://as.ff.uni-lj.si/sites/default/files/documents/jana%20ro%C5%A1ker%20publications%202012-22_0%20%288%29.docx

Books (2012-22)

- 2022. (In Slovene): Humanizem v medkulturni perspektivi: primer Kitajske (Humanism in Intercultural Perspective: the Case of China). Ljubljana: Ljubljana University Press.

- 2021. Interpreting Chinese Philosophy: A New Methodology. London; New York: Bloomsbury Academic. 

- 2021. Female Philosophers in Contemporary Taiwan and the Problem of Women in Chinese Thought. Newcastle upon Tyne: Cambridge Scholars Publishing.

- 2021. (In Slovene): Kriza kot nevarnost in upanje: etika pandemij, razcvet avtokracij in sanje o avtonomiji v transkulturni perspektivi, (Crisis as Danger and Hope: The Ethics of Pandemics, the Rise of Autocracies and the Dream of Autonomy in a Transcultural Perspective). Ljubljana: Ljubljana University Press. 

- 2020. Becoming Human: Li Zehou's ethics. Leiden, Boston: Brill. 

- 2020. (In Slovene). V senci vélikih mojstrov: vprašanje žensk v kitajski filozofiji na primeru dveh sodobnih tajvanskih filozofinj. (In the Shadow of the Grand Masters: The Question of Women in Chinese Philosophy in the Case of Two Contemporary Taiwanese Philosophers). Ljubljana: Ljubljana University Press. 

- 2019. Following His Own Path: Li Zehou And Contemporary Chinese Philosophy, (Albany: State University of New York Press (SUNY).

- 2016. (In German): Anarchismus in China an der Schwelle des 20. Jahrhunderts: Eine vergleichende Studie zu Staatstheorie und anarchistischem Gedankengut in China und Europa. Saarbrücken: Südwestdeutscher Verlag für Hochschulschriften. 

- 2016. The Rebirth of the Moral Self: the Second Generation of Modern Confucians and their Modernization Discourses. Hong Kong: Chinese University Press. 

- 2015. (In Slovene). Wang Hui in vprašanje modernosti ter demokracije na Kitajskem. (Wang Hui and the Issue of Modernity and Democracy in China). Ljubljana: Ljubljana University Press. 

- 2014. (In Slovene). Kjer vlada sočlovečnost, je ljudstvo srečno : tradicionalne kitajske teorije države, (Humane Government, Happy People: Traditional Chinese State Theories). Ljubljana: Pedagoški inštitut.  

- 2013. (In Slovene). Subjektova nova oblačila - idejne osnove modernizacije v delih druge generacije modernega konfucijanstvo. (The Subject's New Clothes - the Ideological Basis of Modernization in the Works of the Second Generation of Modern Confucianism). Ljubljana: Ljubljana University Press. 

- 2012. Traditional Chinese philosophy and the paradigm of structure (Li). Newcastle upon Tyne: Cambridge Scholars Publishing.

Videolectures

(In Slovenian): He Zhen in dekolonializacija feminizma. Invited 
public lecture, organized by the Institute for Worker Studies (IDŠ). https://www.youtube.com/watch?v=n_bj6b0rZ3Q&t=1716s. [COBISS.SI-ID 102061315].

Transcultural Methodology, Sublation, and a Simple Question: Do Flying Arrows Move? Hui Shi vs. Zeno (Methodological Problems in Transcultural Philosophy: (Post)comparative Approaches and the Method of Sublation). Keynote speech at Tsinghua University, Beijing as part of the HOLIC Workshop, Jan 16, 2022. 
https://www.youtube.com/watch?v=KPAIRKXxqKg. [COBISS.SI-ID 93620995]

Comparative Philosophy: Analytical and Hermeneutic Methods in Studying Chinese Thought: Online lecture at the 6th SDCF Greater China Online Summer Program in Chinese Studies, 26 July 2021. https://www.youtube.com/watch?v=wUlxFdU24jU&t=1668s. [COBISS.SI-ID 71510019]

The Hermeneutics of Self and the Other: Self-Identity and Intersubjectivity in Chinese Philosophy: Lecture at Chinese Culture Studies Program for Global Young Scholar, School of Philosophy at Beijing Normal University, 30. 11. 2021. https://www.youtube.com/watch?v=HGR1EyYhqII. [COBISS.SI-ID 88020227]

Li Zehou and Modern Confucianism: Online lecture at BNU Philosophy Summer School 2021 "Traditional Chinese Philosophy: Human Nature and Virtue", Beijing Normal University, 5th-11th July 2021. https://www.youtube.com/watch?v=KsUrvUgtc70&t=4601s. [COBISS.SI-ID 71260419]

(In Slovenian). Konfucijanski relacionizem kot alternativni model organizacije družb v časih virusnih pandemij. (Confuician Relationism as an Alternative Model of Social Organization in Times of Viral Pandemics): Lecture at the symposium organized by the University of Primorska and the Research Institute of Education in Koper, Sept. 09, 2021. Title: Discourses of Pandemics: Rhetoric of Contagion, Contagious Rhetoric. https://www.youtube.com/watch?v=n2OwbxFGn_8. [COBISS.SI-ID 76139779]

Asian values and the legacy of European enlightenment: freedom and social responsibility in times of global crises: Keynote speech at 2021 Situations Virtual International Conference "Between Asia and Europe: Whiter Comparative Cultural Studies?", University of Ljubljana, Slovenia May 21st - 22nd, 2021. 
https://www.youtube.com/watch?v=O81F57OX3dk&t=75s.  [COBISS.SI-ID 64379139] 

Arnason, Modern Confucianism and the Cultural Conditionality of Modernization: Lecture at the Online international conference on Johann P. Arnason's 80th birthday: Imaginaries in Intercultural Perspective; Department of Philosophy, University of Vienna, March 22-23, 2021. https://www.youtube.com/watch?v=bMoIPZskEUE [COBISS.SI-ID 57018371].

(In Slovenian). Pomen tajvanske filozofije in humanizem v medkulturni perspektivi (The Significance of Taiwanese Philosophy and Humanism in Transcultural Perspective): Online Symposium of the Department of Asian Studies for the 25th Jubilee of its Establishment. March 26th, 2021.
https://www.youtube.com/watch?v=oOcdLNKjCF0&t=340s . [COBISS.SI-ID 57558019].

Methodological Issues in Transcultural Philosophy: From Old Problems to New Approaches: Lecture at Online-Workshop Comparative, Transcultural, Global? Chinese Philosophy and the Question of Methodology; Institute of Philosophy, Freie Universität Berlin, December 11-12, 2021. https://www.youtube.com/watch?v=f2r0XXtXSik&t=31s. [COBISS.SI-ID 89050883]

(In Chinese): 苏轼著作中的哲学因素Su Shi zhuzuo zhongde zhexue yinsu. Keynote lecture at the 6th External Conference on Su Dongpo of the National Assembly in Meishan, on September11, 2020.
https://www.youtube.com/watch?v=2g6FHIOVMGU&t=209s 
[COBISS.SI-ID 38250499].

References

External links
 Full bibliography on COBISS
 Jana Rošker at Academia.edu
 Epistemology in Chinese Philosophy in the Stanford Encyclopedia of Philosophy

Slovenian sinologists
1960 births
Living people
People from Murska Sobota
University of Vienna alumni
Academic staff of the University of Ljubljana
Bisexual academics